The Japan Academy Film Prize for Picture of the Year is a film award given to the best film at the annual Japan Academy Film Prize.

Picture of the year
Awards established in 1978
1978 establishments in Japan
Awards for best film
Lists of Japanese films